Club Bàsquet Pardinyes, also known as Ilerdauto Nissan Pardinyes Lleida by sponsorship reasons, is a basketball team based in the neighbourhood of Pardinyes in Lleida, Catalonia, that currently plays in LEB Plata.

History
Founded in 1966, Pardinyes started playing in provincial leagues. In 2013, the club promoted to Liga EBA after achieving five consecutive promotions in six years.

In 2017, the club reached the promotion playoffs but failed in the final stage but, two seasons later, the club would complete the best performance of the league thus achieving promotion to LEB Plata on 18 May 2019 and being named as champions of the Liga EBA.

Season by season

Honours 
Liga EBA: (1)
2018–19

References

External links
Official Page

Basketball teams established in 1966
Catalan basketball teams
LEB Plata teams
Former Liga EBA teams
Sport in Lleida